Hira Te Popo (?–1889) was a notable New Zealand tribal leader. Of Māori descent, he identified with the Te Whakatohea iwi.

References

1889 deaths
Whakatōhea people
Year of birth missing